Hospital México is a hospital located in the western part of San José in Costa Rica.  The hospital, operated by the Costa Rican Social Security Fund, has 633 beds and it is certified for trauma and emergency medical services.

References

External links

Hospitals in San José, Costa Rica